Acacia kempeana (Acacia or ακακία (akakia) from the Greek word Akis for thorn and kempeana after Pastor Kempe, co-founder of Lutheran Mission at Hermannburg-Ntaria in 1877), commonly known as wanderrie wattle, witchetty bush or granite wattle, is a shrub  in subfamily Mimosoideae of family Fabaceae that is endemic to arid parts of central and western Australia.

Description 
It has furrowed, usually grey or brown coloured bark and terete, glabrous terete branchlets that are slightly scurfy. Like most Acacia species, it has phyllodes rather than true leaves. The phyllodes have a narrowly elliptic to narrowly elliptic, sometimes narrowly oblanceolate shape. The flowers between January or April and September are yellow, and held in cylindrical clusters  in length.

Taxonomy
The species was first formally described by the botanist Ferdinand von Mueller in 1882 as part of the work Remarks on Australian Acacias as published in the Australasian Chemist and Druggist. It was reclassified as Racosperma kempeanum in 1987 by Leslie Pedley then transferred back to the genus Acacia in 2006.
It is closely related to Acacia sibirica, Acacia duriuscula and Acacia aprepta.

Uses 
Witchetty grubs are a traditional staple food in arid regions. These larvae feed on the roots of the witchetty bush (for which they are named), as well as other Acacia species. The bush also provides edible gum and seeds.

Distribution
The shrub is widely distributed through arid and semi-arid inland areas of Western Australia, South Australia, the Northern Territory and Queensland. It is often found growing on stony hillsides and in a variety of soil types, especially coarse textured alluvium, and can often form part of mulga woodland communities on plains with sandy to loamy soils.

Cultivation
The shrub can be propagated from scarified seeds or seeds pre-treated in boiling water. It grows well in an open, sunny and reasonably well-drained position and is suitable for most soil types. It is a hardy species in dry and low maintenance areas, well noted for being both drought and frost tolerant.

See also
List of Acacia species

References

 

kempeana
Fabales of Australia
Acacias of Western Australia
Flora of New South Wales
Flora of Queensland
Flora of South Australia
Bushfood
Australian Aboriginal bushcraft
Shrubs
Plants described in 1882
Taxa named by Ferdinand von Mueller